Guillermo Jiménez Leal (born 18 May 1947 in Libertad, Barinas state, Venezuela) is a Venezuelan singer, musician and poet who is renowned for his distinctive style of Llanos music.

He spent part of his musical career in France, which influenced and forged his style, tempering the usual sharp tone and rapid tempo of Llanos music, through immersing himself in the rich Paris music scene among other European and Latin American musicians, and adapting traditional Venezuelan musical elements for a broader world audience.

References

External links
 Howling Earth profile

1947 births
Living people
People from Barinas (state)
Venezuelan musicians